Antonio Esparza (born 6 January 1962) is a Spanish former professional racing cyclist. He rode in the 1986 Tour de France as well as in seven editions of the Vuelta a España.

Major results

1985
1st Circuito de Getxo
1st Stage 5 Tour of Galicia
3rd Clásica de Sabiñánigo
5th Trofeo Masferrer
1986
1st Trofeo Masferrer
1987
Vuelta a España
1st Stages 9 & 15
1st Stage 1 Vuelta a los Valles Mineros
3rd Overall Vuelta a Castilla y León
1988
2nd Trofeo Masferrer
1989
1st Stage 2 Vuelta a Murcia
2001
2nd Overall Troféu Joaquim Agostinho

References

External links
 

1962 births
Living people
Spanish male cyclists
Sportspeople from Sabadell
Cyclists from Catalonia
20th-century Spanish people